Aloha is a 1931 American drama film directed by Albert S. Rogell and starring Ben Lyon, Raquel Torres and Thelma Todd. It was produced and distributed by the independent studio Tiffany Pictures, one of the largest companies outside of the major studios. It was released in Britain by Gaumont British Distributors under the alternative title No Greater Love.

Synopsis
In the South Seas, an island girl Ilanu of mixed heritage refuses to marry the man chosen for her and instead falls in love with a Harvard-educated American.

Cast 
 Ben Lyon as Jimmy Bradford
 Raquel Torres as  Ilanu
 Robert Edeson as James Bradford, Sr.
 Alan Hale as Stevens
 Thelma Todd as Winifred Bradford
 Ena Gregory as Elaine Marvin
 Otis Harlan as Old Ben
 T. Roy Barnes as Johnny Marvin
 Robert Ellis as Larry Leavitt
 Donald Reed as Kahea
 Al St. John as Sailor
 Dickie Moore as Junior Bradford
 Marcia Harris as Governess
 Addie McPhail as Rosalie

References

External links 

1931 films
Tiffany Pictures films
1931 drama films
Films directed by Albert S. Rogell
American drama films
American black-and-white films
1930s English-language films
1930s American films